Alexander McNeill (1833 – 17 May 1915) was a 19th-century member of parliament from Southland, New Zealand.

He was the son of Anne Elizabeth McNeill née Carstairs, and Alexander McNeill (1791–1850), brother of Duncan McNeill, Lord Colonsay (1793–1874) and of Sir John McNeill (1795–1883). His own brother was Major General Sir John McNeill VC (1831–1904).

He and his brother John survived the wreck of the Orion in 1850, in which his parents and two sisters lost their lives.

As a member of the Royal Engineers, McNeill participated in the Indian Rebellion of 1857 for the entire conflict. He was wounded in the Siege of Delhi. At Calcutta, he married the daughter of Captain Henry Forrester Leighton; she was also the niece of Sir Archibald Wilson, the commander-in-chief at Delhi.

He retired from the Royal Engineers and came to New Zealand, where he and his brother, Sir Malcolm McNeill, bought Ardlussa Station in Southland. They named it after their family's estate of Ardlussa, on the island of Jura, Scotland.

From the mid-1880s, he lived in Wanganui, where he died on 17 May 1915. He was buried at Wanganui Cemetery.

References

1833 births
1915 deaths
Members of the New Zealand House of Representatives
People from Southland, New Zealand
New Zealand MPs for South Island electorates
19th-century New Zealand politicians